Béla Varga (18 February 1903 – 13 October 1995) was a Hungarian Catholic priest and politician. He was one of the founders of the Independent Smallholders' Party. Varga was arrested by the Soviet troops in 1945 and sentenced to death, but released and served as Speaker of the National Assembly of Hungary February 7, 1946 – July 3, 1947. Msgr. Varga emigrated to the United States in 1947, where he worked as a priest in New York City, but returned to his native country after the communists lost their power.

References 

1903 births
1995 deaths
People from Győr-Moson-Sopron County
20th-century Hungarian Roman Catholic priests
Independent Smallholders, Agrarian Workers and Civic Party politicians
Speakers of the National Assembly of Hungary
Members of the National Assembly of Hungary (1945–1947)